Ivan Sertić (born 27 February 1985) is a Croatian retired football forward.

Career
Sertić start to play football in NK Rijeka. Between 2001 and 2003 Sertić is a part of Croatia national under-17 football team.

In 2005, he is loaned in NK Novalja for six months.

In season 2007/08 the forward played for NK Pomorac.
In summer 2008 he signed a contract with Bulgarian Belasitsa Petrich. Sertić made his official debut for the Bulgarian club on 10 August 2008 in a match against CSKA Sofia as a 74th min substitute. On 8 November 2008 he scored his first goal for Belasitsa in a match against Litex Lovech.

In July 2015, Sertić returned to his former club HNK Orijent 1919. Two years later, in June 2017, he announced his retirement from football.

References

External links

 Ivan Sertić profile at Nogometni Magazin 
 Ivan Sertić at HNS

1985 births
Living people
Footballers from Rijeka
Association football forwards
Croatian footballers
Croatia youth international footballers
Croatia under-21 international footballers
HNK Rijeka players
NK Novalja players
HNK Orijent players
NK Pomorac 1921 players
PFC Belasitsa Petrich players
NK Nehaj players
NK Jadran Poreč players
NK Grobničan players
Croatian Football League players
First Football League (Croatia) players
First Professional Football League (Bulgaria) players
Croatian expatriate footballers
Expatriate footballers in Bulgaria
Croatian expatriate sportspeople in Bulgaria